Phachi is a district in the eastern part of Ayutthaya province.

History
The district was created in 1953, by separating it from Uthai district.

Phachi in Thai means 'divide' or 'junction', which refers to the railway junction between the northern and northeastern branches in the district.

Geography
Neighboring districts are (from the north clockwise) Tha Ruea of Ayutthaya Province; Nong Saeng and Nong Khae of Saraburi province; and Uthai and Nakhon Luang of Ayutthaya.

Administration
The district is divided into eight sub-districts (tambon).

References

Pachi